Ilya Sutskever  (born 1985/86) is a Canadian computer scientist working in machine learning, who co-founded and serves as Chief Scientist of OpenAI.

He has made several major contributions to the field of deep learning. He is the co-inventor, with Alex Krizhevsky and Geoffrey Hinton, of AlexNet, a convolutional neural network. Sutskever is also one of the many authors of the AlphaGo paper.

Early life and career
Ilya Sutskever was born in Nizhny Novgorod, Russia, at the time part of the Soviet Union, and immigrated with his family to Israel. He spent his formative years in Jerusalem.

Sutskever attended the Open University of Israel between 2000 and 2002 before moving with his family to Canada and transferred to the University of Toronto, where he then obtained his BSc (2005) in mathematicsand his MSc (2007) and PhD (2012) in computer science under the supervision of Geoffrey Hinton.

After graduation in 2012, Sutskever spent two months as a postdoc with Andrew Ng at Stanford University. He then returned to University of Toronto and joined Hinton's new research company DNNResearch, a spinoff of Hinton's research group. Four months later, in March 2013, Google acquired DNNResearch and hired Sutskever as a research scientist at Google Brain.

At Google Brain, Sutskever worked with Oriol Vinyals and Quoc Viet Le to create the sequence-to-sequence learning algorithm.

In 2015, Sutskever was named in MIT Technology Review's 35 Innovators Under 35.

At the end of 2015 he left Google to become the director of newly founded OpenAI.

Sutskever was the keynote speaker at NVIDIA NTECH 2018 and AI Frontiers Conference 2018.

He was elected a Fellow of the Royal Society in 2022.

See also
 Oriol Vinyals

References

Living people
1985 births
Russian expatriates in the United States
University of Toronto alumni
Stanford University alumni
Canadian Fellows of the Royal Society
Machine learning researchers
Google employees
Canadian computer scientists
Artificial intelligence researchers
Canadian expatriates in the United States
People from Nizhny Novgorod
Fellows of the Royal Society